The Río de la Plata ("river of silver"), also called the River Plate or La Plata River in English, is the estuary formed by the confluence of the Uruguay River and the Paraná River at Punta Gorda. It empties into the Atlantic Ocean and forms a funnel-shaped indentation on the southeastern coastline of South America. Depending on the geographer, the Río de la Plata may be considered a river, an estuary, a gulf, or a marginal sea.

 
It forms part of the border between Argentina and Uruguay. The name Río de la Plata is also used to refer to the populations along the estuary, especially the main port cities of Buenos Aires and Montevideo, where Ríoplatense Spanish is spoken and tango culture developed. The coasts of the river are the most densely-populated areas of Uruguay and Argentina.

Geography
The Río de la Plata begins at the confluence of the Uruguay and Paraná rivers at Punta Gorda and flows eastward into the South Atlantic Ocean. No clear physical boundary marks the river's eastern end; the International Hydrographic Organization defines the eastern boundary of the Río de la Plata as "a line joining Punta del Este, Uruguay and Cabo San Antonio, Argentina".

Though it is generally spoken of as a river, the Río de la Plata is considered by some geographers to be a large bay or marginal sea of the Atlantic Ocean.

Islands and shoals
The upper river contains several islands, including Oyarvide Island and the Solís Islands in Argentine waters and Juncal Island, Islote el Matón, Martín García Island and Timoteo Domínguez Island in Uruguayan waters. Because of deposition of sediments from the heavy stream load carried down from the river's tributaries, the islands in the Río de la Plata generally grow over time.

A submerged shoal, the Barra del Indio, divides the Río de la Plata into an inner freshwater riverine portion and an outer brackish estuarine portion. The shoal is located approximately between Montevideo and Punta Piedras (the northwest end of Samborombón Bay). The river's discharge is strong enough to prevent saltwater from penetrating to the inner portion.

Hydrology
The Río de la Plata behaves as an estuary in which freshwater and seawater mix. The freshwater comes principally from the Paraná River (one of the world's longest rivers and La Plata's main tributary) as well as from the Uruguay River and other smaller streams. Currents in the Río de la Plata are dominated by tides reaching to its sources and beyond, into the Uruguay and Paraná rivers. The tidal ranges in the Río de la Plata are small, but its great width allows for a tidal prism important enough to dominate the flow regime despite the huge discharge received from the tributary rivers.

The river is a salt wedge estuary in which saltwater, being more dense than freshwater, penetrates into the estuary in a layer below the freshwater, which floats on the surface. Salinity fronts, or haloclines, form at the bottom and on the surface, where fresh and brackish waters meet. The salinity fronts are also pycnoclines due to the water density discontinuities. They play an important role in the reproductive processes of fish species.

Drainage basin

The Río de la Plata's drainage basin (sometimes called the Platine basin or Platine region) is the - hydrographical area that drains to the Río de la Plata. It includes areas of southeastern Bolivia, southern and central Brazil, the entire country of Paraguay, most of Uruguay, and northern Argentina. Making up about one fourth of the continent's surface, it is the second largest drainage basin in South America (after the Amazon basin) and one of the largest in the world.

Tributaries

The main rivers of the La Plata basin are the Paraná River, the Paraguay River (the Paraná's main tributary), and the Uruguay River.

The Paraná River's main tributaries include the Paranaíba River, Grande River, Tietê River, Paranapanema River, Iguazu River, Paraguay River, and the Salado River, after which it ends in the large Paraná Delta. The Paraguay River flows through the Pantanal wetland, after which its main tributaries include the Pilcomayo River and the Bermejo River, before it ends in the Paraná. The Uruguay's main tributaries include the Pelotas River, Canoas River, Ibicuí River, and the Río Negro. Another significant tributary to the Río de la Plata is the Salado del Sur River.

History

European exploration
The Río de la Plata was first explored by the Portuguese in 1512–13. The Spanish first explored it in 1516, when the navigator Juan Díaz de Solís traversed it during his search for a passage between the Atlantic and the Pacific Oceans, calling it the Mar Dulce, or "freshwater sea." The Portuguese navigator Ferdinand Magellan briefly explored the estuary in 1520 before his expedition continued its circumnavigation, and in 1521 Cristóvão Jacques also explored the Plate River estuary and ascended the Parana River for the first time, entering it for about 23 leagues (around 140 km) to near the present city of Rosario. 

Explorer Sebastian Cabot made a detailed study of the river and its tributaries and gave it its modern name. He explored the Paraná and Uruguay rivers between 1526 and 1529, ascending the Paraná as far as the present-day city of Asunción, and also explored up the Paraguay River. Cabot acquired silver trinkets trading with the Guaraní near today's Asunción, and these objects (together with legends of a "Sierra de la Plata" in the South American interior brought back by earlier explorers) inspired him to rename the river "Río de la Plata" ("River of Silver").

The first European colony was the city of Buenos Aires, founded by Pedro de Mendoza on 2 February 1536. This settlement, however, was quickly abandoned; the failure to establish a settlement on the estuary led to explorations upriver and the founding of Asunción in 1537. The area was visited by Francis Drake's fleet in early 1578, in the early stages of his circumnavigation. Buenos Aires was refounded by Juan de Garay on 11 June 1580.

Colonial period

During the colonial era, the Río de la Plata was made the center of the Governorate of the Río de la Plata. The Río de la Plata region, particularly Buenos Aires, was a significant site of trade throughout the 17th century. The Crown initially intended Buenos Aires to be a military establishment for the protection of the Potosí mines, but it soon became evident that a settlement large enough to provide military defense would attract trade. The primary export was silver from the mines of Potosí, and imports generally included European luxury goods, slaves, and sugar. This trade occurred outside of the fleet system authorized by the Spanish Crown, and therefore was generally considered "illicit." However, under the monarchy of the Spanish Habsburgs, the line between licit and illicit trade was quite blurry. Crown officials and military outposts in Buenos Aires often relied upon profits from illicit trade to support their administrative structures. 

Under the Bourbon monarchy, the governorate was elevated to the Viceroyalty of the Río de la Plata in 1776. This occurred as a result of the Bourbon Reforms, which attempted to restore the decaying wealth of the Spanish Crown. The reforms elevated the status of trade along the Río de la Plata and expanded what constituted "legal" trade so that the Crown could tax trade what had previously been "contraband." However, the plan did not go as intended. Although trade along the Río de la Plata flourished, very little silver was actually remitted to the Crown. Then, Spanish war with Britain and the simultaneous eruption of revolts in the mining regions of Peru led to a shortage of silver, putting strain on the merchant class of Buenos Aires. This caused a schism between merchants who wanted to try to continue reviving the Spanish Empire through silver trade and those who wanted to move on from silver and prioritize agricultural exports, ultimately tearing at the fabric of the Río de la Plata region's relationship with the Spanish Empire.

In 1806 and 1807 the river was the scene of an important British invasion that aimed to occupy the area and was defeated by the local garrison and population.

Revolutionary period
Conflict in the region intensified after the independence of the former Spanish and Portuguese colonies in the first quarter of the 19th century. Interests in the territories and the navigation rights over the Platine region played a major role in many armed conflicts throughout the century, including the Argentine civil wars, the Cisplatine and Platine wars, and the Paraguayan War. The river was blockaded by France and Britain in 1838–1840 and 1845–1850.

Naval Battles

Battle of Juncal (1827)

During the Cisplatine War, the Battle of Juncal (named after Juncal Island) took place in the waters of the Río de la Plata from 8–9 February 1827 between squadrons of the newly independent United Provinces of the River Plate and the Brazilian Empire. The Argentines scored a decisive victory, capturing or destroying fifteen Brazilian vessels and losing none.

Battle of the River Plate (1939)

The German ship retired up the estuary with a crippled fuel system and put into port at Montevideo. A few days later, rather than fight when believing himself outgunned, her captain scuttled her in the estuary. This engagement was part of the early Battle of the Atlantic.

English names
The historical English name "River Plate" uses an obsolete sense of the word "plate", which was used extensively as a term for "silver" or "gold" from the 12th century onwards, especially in Early Modern English. The estuary has been known as the River Plate or Plate River in English since at least the time of Francis Drake. This English version of the name served as an inspiration for one of Argentina's most important football clubs, Club Atlético River Plate.

A more literal translation of the name is "Silver River", though this is virtually never used in practice.

Fauna
The Río de la Plata is a habitat for the loggerhead sea turtle, green sea turtle, leatherback sea turtle, the rare La Plata dolphin, and many species of fish.

See also
Rioplatense Spanish
Argentina–Uruguay relations
1973 Boundary Treaty between Uruguay and Argentina
The Fontana dei Quattro Fiumi, in Rome's Piazza Navona, contains a figure representing the River Plate.
1888 Río de la Plata earthquake

References

Bibliography

 
 
 
 
Real, Walter. España en el Río de la Plata: Descubrimiento y Poblamientos (1516–1588). Montevideo: Club Español. 2001. .

External links

Treaty between Uruguay and Argentina concerning the Rio de la Plata and the Corresponding Maritime Boundary (19 November 1973)
Paraguay, or the Province of the Rio de la Plata, with the Adjacent Regions Tucamen and Santa Cruz de la Sierra is a map from 1616 depicting the area
"An Account of a Voyage up the River de la Plata, and Thence over Land to Peru: With Observations on the Inhabitants, as Well as Indians and Spaniards, the Cities, Commerce, Fertility, and Riches of That Part of America" from 1698

 
Rivers of Argentina
Rivers of Uruguay
Argentina–Uruguay border
International rivers of South America
La Plata basin
Border rivers
Estuaries of South America
Rivers of Buenos Aires Province
Rivers of Canelones Department
Rivers of Colonia Department
Rivers of Maldonado Department
Rivers of Montevideo Department
Rivers of San José Department
Temperate South America